Swingin' Records was a Hollywood based record label that released recordings by artists such as Big Jay McNeely, Rochell & the Candles and The Hollywood Saxons.

Background
The label was formed in 1959 by Roger Davenport and Hunter Hancock. Its first release was "There Is Something on Your Mind" which was a hit for sax player, Big Jay McNeely. The catalogue also included releases by  Marvin & Johnny, Rochell & the Candles and the Hollywood Saxons. It was located at 1554 N. Gower Hollywood, CA.

In the mid 1960s, Davenport would later run Consolidated International Record Co. with Al Stewart.

History
It was reported in the May 25, 1959 issue of The Billboard that Swingin' was one of the 15 new labels that started up in the last week.

Discography (USA)

References

Record labels established in 1959
Record labels based in California